The 1942 Istanbul Football Cup season was the first season of the cup. Galatasaray won the cup for the first time. The tournament was single-elimination.

Season

1/8 Finals

|}

1/8 Finals

|}

Quarterfinals

|}

Semifinals

|}

Final
15 March 1942

|}

Match details

References

Istanbul Football Cup
Istanbul